Abdoulaye Konaté (1 February 1953) is a Malian artist. He was born in Diré and lives and works in Bamako.

Konaté studied painting at the Institut National des Arts de Bamako and then at the Instituto Superior de Arte, Havana, Cuba.

Career
Konaté worked as a graphic designer at the Musee National in Bamako. In 1998, he was appointed to be the Director of the Palais de la Culture. He now works as the principal of the Conservatoire des Arts et Métiers Multimédia Balla Fasseké Kouyaté in Bamako, Mali.

He and his work have received several awards, including in 2002 the Chevalier de l'Ordre National du Mali and Chevalier de l'Ordre des Arts et des Lettres de France.

Exhibitions

Solo shows 
 2013- Abdoulaye Konaté - Primo Marella Gallery Milan, Milan
 2011- Abdoulaye Konaté: Window Commission 2011 - Institute of International Visual Arts - iniva, London
 2009- Textiles - Heidelberger Forum für Kunst, Heidelberg
 1999- Abdoulaye Konaté - Tuchbilder + Installation - Dany Keller Galerie - Munich, Munich

Group shows 
2014
 Destination...1:54: Contemporary African Art - Primo Marella Gallery Milan, Milan
 The Divine Comedy. Heaven, Purgatory and Hell Revisited by Contemporary African Artists -Museum für Moderne Kunst (MMK), Frankfurt/Main2013
 Decorum - Musée d´Art Moderne de la Ville de Paris - MAM/ARC, Paris
 Hollandaise - Raw Material Company, Dakar

2012
 Hollandaise - Stedelijk Museum Bureau Amsterdam - SMBA, Amsterdam
 Moving Into Space: Football and Art in West Africa - National Football Museum, Manchester
 We Face Forward: Art from West Africa Today - Manchester Art Gallery, Manchester

2010
 Africa, Assume Art Position! - Primo Marella Gallery Milan, Milan
 Textiles - Fondation Jean Paul Blachere, Apt
 Dak’Art 2010 - Dak’Art 1990 > 2010 : rétrospective et perspectives - Dak'Art Biennale de l’art africain contemporain, Dakar

2009
10. Bienal de La Habana - La Bienal de La Habana, Havana

2008
 INPUT - Colecção Sindika Dokolo - Museu Nacional de História Natural, Luanda
 Travesía - Centro Atlántico de Arte Moderno (CAAM), Las Palmas de Gran Canaria
 7th Gwangju Biennale - Gwangju Biennale, Gwangju
 Angaza Afrika - African Art Now - October Gallery, London
 Artes Mundi 3 - National Museum Cardiff, Cardiff, Wales

2007
 Brocken Memory - Ghana National Art Museum, Accra
 Contct Zone - Musée National du Mali, Bamako
 Africa Remix - Contemporary art of a continent - Johannesburg Art Gallery (JAG), Johannesburg
 Documenta 12 - Documenta, Kassel

2006
 Trienal de Luanda 2007 - Trienal de Luanda, Luanda
 2° Bienal Internacional de Arte Contemporáneo de Sevilla - BIACS - Fundación Bienal Internacional de Arte Contemporáneo de Sevilla, Sevilla
 Africa Remix - Moderna Museet, Stockholm
 SD Observatorio - IVAM - Institut Valencià d'Art Modern, Valencia
 Africa Remix - Contemporary Art of a Continent - Mori Art Museum, Tokyo
 7ème Biennale de l´Art Africain contemporain - Dak'Art Biennale de l’art africain contemporain, Dakar

2005
 African Remix - l'art contemporain d'un continent - Centre Pompidou - Musée National d´Art Moderne, Paris
 Africa Remix – Contemporary Art of a Continent - Hayward Gallery, London

2004
Afrika Remix - Zeitgenössische Kunst eines Kontinents - Museum Kunstpalast, Dusseldorf

1998
24° Bienal de São Paulo - Bienal de Sao Paulo, São Paulo

1997
Die Anderen Modernen : Zeitgenössische Kunst aus Afrika, Asien und Lateinamerika - Haus der Kulturen der Welt, Berlin

Influences
Combining his painting skills with installation work, he comments on political and environmental affairs. The encroachment of the Sahel and the impact of AIDS on society and on individuals have been two major themes in his work.

His questioning of the political, social, and economic scenes in contemporary Mali is evident in how AIDS, wars, ecological issues, human rights, and globalization affects all aspects of life and individuals within society. Much of his large-scale work is textile-based, a medium that is more readily available than paints.

Artes Mundi 
In 2008 Konaté was nominated for the Artes Mundi prize. His exhibition included pieces such as Les Marcheurs and Tafo ou la force du verbe.

Literature 
La toile d'Abdoulaye Konaté / Joëlle Busca. - Bamako, Mali, Ministère de la culture et Dakar, Senegal, Galerie nationale d'art, 2011.

Abdoulaya Konaté /  edited by Camilla Jalving ... [et al.]. - London, BlainSouthern and Ishøj, Arken, 2016.

References

External links
 Abdoulaye Konaté - Tiroche DeLeon Collection
 Blain|Southern | Artists | Abdoulaye Konaté
 Universes in Universe - Abdoulaye Konaté. Africa Remix

Malian artists
1953 births
Living people
People from Bamako
People from Tombouctou Region
21st-century Malian people
Instituto Superior de Arte alumni